Frambold (in Latin: Framboldus) or sometimes Franbolt, Frambaud, Franbourd was the fifteenth bishop of Bayeux around 691 to 720.
The life of Saint Frambold remains mysterious. The place and date of his birth are unknown. Robert Cénalis, bishop of Avranches in the sixteenth century said of him only that "his holiness spread a lively radiance". He had been a monk and abbot of the diocese of Mans.

Frambold is represented on a stained glass window in the north transept of Notre-Dame de Bayeux cathedral and in a painting on one of the vaults of the choir.

Frambold would have been buried in the Saint-Exupère church in Bayeux alongside the first bishops of Bayeux.

Controversy 
There is no evidence for Frambold, or Framboldus, outside the 9th century episcopal list. Fisquet, questions his existence and Duchesne, does not include Framboldus in his list of actual bishops.

References

Bishops of Bayeux
7th-century births
8th-century deaths
Year of birth unknown
Year of death unknown